Le Jazz Non: A Compilation of Norwegian Noise is a compilation album of experimental Norwegian music, released on the Smalltown Supersound label in 2000. The album acts as a follow-up to the Le Jazz Non compilation of New Zealand music, released on Corpus Hermeticum in 1996.

Track listing
 Lasse Marhaug : "Light Silence"
 Supersilent : "C-2.1"
 Larmoyant : "Push Here For Tiger"
 DEL : "Sunset Cove"
 Der Brief : "All Sorts 02"
 Elektro Nova : "Untitled"
 Jazzkammer : "President of the Improv Shipping Company"
 Kjetil Brandsdal : "Komboloi"
 Arm : "Teddy Transition"
 Fibo Trespo : "Shit Phifter"
 Continental Fruit : "Kenosis"
 Two Shot Sons : "Constant Guitar"

2000 compilation albums
Smalltown Supersound albums